Barry Graham Legge (born October 22, 1954) is a Canadian former professional ice hockey player who played 107 games in the National Hockey League and 345 games in the World Hockey Association. He played for the Winnipeg Jets, Quebec Nordiques, Michigan Stags, Baltimore Blades, Denver Spurs, Ottawa Civics, Cleveland Crusaders, Minnesota Fighting Saints, and Cincinnati Stingers.

Career 
After five full seasons in the WHA, Barry Legge spent part of three seasons with the Quebec Nordiques and the Winnipeg Jets from 1979-80 to 1981-82. He was well known for his defensive play from a very young age. The Winnipeg native first made a name for himself with the Fort St. James Canadians before joining the hometown Jets of the WCJHL. After being selected in the 4th round of the 1974 NHL Draft by the Montreal Canadiens, Legge opted to join the Michigan Stags of the WHA, who had selected him in the 1974 WHA Amateur Draft and ended up playing on half a dozen teams before the league disbanded in 1979. Legge's best season was a 29-point effort on the Cincinnati Stingers in 1976-77. Following the NHL/WHA merger, the Winnipeg Jets claimed Legge off the Stingers' roster. A few days later he was traded to the Nordiques for rugged defenceman Barry Melrose. He recorded three assists in 31 games for the Nords, but his season ended on a sour note when he refused an assignment to the minor leagues and was suspended by the team as a result. After the season, Legge was sent to the Jets for cash and split the next two seasons between the NHL and the CHL's Tulsa Oilers. He retired the next year after playing 38 games for Winnipeg and battling injuries.

With the Michigan Stags and Baltimore Blades as a rookie, and the following year with the Cleveland Crusaders, he was a teammate of namesake Randy Legge; however the two were not related.

Career statistics

Regular season and playoffs

References

External links
 

1954 births
Living people
Baltimore Blades players
Canadian ice hockey defencemen
Cincinnati Stingers players
Cleveland Crusaders players
Denver Spurs (WHA) players
Greensboro Generals (SHL) players
Michigan Stags draft picks
Michigan Stags players
Minnesota Fighting Saints players
Montreal Canadiens draft picks
Ottawa Civics players
Quebec Nordiques players
Ice hockey people from Winnipeg
St. James Canadians players
Tulsa Oilers (1964–1984) players
Winnipeg Clubs players
Winnipeg Jets (WHL) players
Winnipeg Jets (1979–1996) players